was a Japanese female artistic gymnast, representing her nation at international competitions.

She participated at the 2000 Summer Olympics. She also competed at world championships, including the 1999 World Artistic Gymnastics Championships, and 2003 World Artistic Gymnastics Championships.

References

External links

1984 births
Living people
Japanese female artistic gymnasts
Sportspeople from Aichi Prefecture
Gymnasts at the 2000 Summer Olympics
Olympic gymnasts of Japan
21st-century Japanese women